Feronit Shabani (born 8 July 1997), known professionally as Fero, is a Kosovo-Albanian rapper, singer and songwriter.

Life and career 

Feronit Shabani was born on 8 July 1997 into an Albanian family in the city of Gjilan, then part of the FR Yugoslavia, present Kosovo. In August 2019, he terminated his contract with On Records and relocated to Berlin, Germany, whereas he established his own music label. The following months, he released four singles, including "Jom rrit" and "Habibi" both entering the music charts in Albania.

Personal life 

In February 2021, Shabani married his longtime girlfriend and Albanian model Arbenita Ismajli.

Discography

Albums 
 Self Loyalty (2020)

Singles

As lead artist

As featured artist

References 

1997 births
21st-century Albanian rappers
21st-century Albanian male singers
Albanian male singers
Albanian-language singers
Albanian songwriters
Living people
Kosovo Albanians
Kosovan rappers
Kosovan singers
People from Gjilan